Tigrinestola tigrina is a species of beetle in the family Cerambycidae. It was described by Skinner in 1905, originally under the genus Lypsimena. It is known from Mexico, Baja California and the United States.

References

Desmiphorini
Beetles described in 1905